Germany participated in the Turkvision Song Contest for the first time at the Turkvision Song Contest 2014 to be held in Kazan, Tatarstan. The German broadcaster,  were the organisers of the debut German entry.

History
On 10 September 2014 it was confirmed that Germany would make their official debut at the 2014 Song Contest to be held in Kazan, Tatarstan. On October 16, 2014, it was revealed that Fahrettin Güneş had been internally selected to represent Germany in Kazan, it was then announced on 7 November 2014 that they band would be singing "Sevdiğim", they were to be joined on stage by NART a Cologne, Germany based dance group. In Kazan, the band did not attend any of the rehearsals due to a delay in receiving a Russian visa.

On 4 January 2015 it was confirmed by the German Head of Delegation that Germany would participate in the 2015 contest.

Participation overview

See also 
 Germany in the Eurovision Dance Contest
 Germany in the Eurovision Song Contest
 Germany in the Eurovision Young Musicians
 Germany in the Junior Eurovision Song Contest

References 

Turkvision
Countries in the Turkvision Song Contest